Allenhurst is a railway station in Allenhurst, Monmouth County, New Jersey, United States. It is served by trains on NJ Transit's North Jersey Coast Line.

History
Allenhurst station opened on May 17, 1897. The station has been listed on the National Register of Historic Places since 1980, despite being demolished in April 1982.

Station layout
The station has two asphalt low-level side platforms.

See also
National Register of Historic Places listings in Monmouth County, New Jersey

References

External links 

 Station from Corlies Avenue from Google Maps Street View

Railway stations in Monmouth County, New Jersey
NJ Transit Rail Operations stations
Railway stations in the United States opened in 1897
Railway stations on the National Register of Historic Places in New Jersey
Stations on the North Jersey Coast Line
National Register of Historic Places in Monmouth County, New Jersey
Allenhurst, New Jersey
Former New York and Long Branch Railroad stations
1897 establishments in New Jersey